R.H. Reny, Inc., doing business as Renys: A Maine Adventure, is a chain of department stores located throughout the state of Maine. The chain has been in business since 1949 when Robert H. Reny opened his first store in Damariscotta. In 2004, two of his sons began running the chain.

In Fortune Magazine's Small Business column, Renys was cited as an example of a small business doing well in the face of competition from Walmart. Renys management studied the competition and realized the company could have an advantage in clothing. Renys purchases small lots of high-quality brands at a discount by buying production overruns, closeouts, irregulars, and factory seconds.

The company headquarters and distribution center are located in Newcastle. There are 17 retail store locations: Bath, Belfast, Bridgton, Camden, Damariscotta (two stores), Dexter, Ellsworth, Farmington, Gardiner, Madison, Pittsfield, Portland, Saco, Topsham, Wells and Windham.

Renys had one store located in Aroostook county, the store was in Maine. The store was closed in September of 1999 due to conditions of the building cited as unsafe. Renys was a popular place to shop for the residents from all around the St John Valley.  The store withstood floods from the St John river, prior to the dike being built downtown.  Also the store on 2 occasions had fire damage.  The store was repaired and reopened only to fall to the hands of time.

External links
 Renys official web site

References

Discount stores of the United States
American companies established in 1949
Retail companies established in 1949
Companies based in Maine